The City is a 1990 album by the Greek artist Vangelis. Reportedly, it was produced entirely in a Rome hotel room, where Vangelis was staying to witness the filming of the Roman Polanski film Bitter Moon. It can be seen as a concept album, citing concepts from urban life and alluding to the big city atmosphere. The album peaked at #3 on the Billboard New Age Albums chart.

Track listing 
All tracks written by Vangelis.
 "Dawn" – 4:16
 "Morning Papers" – 3:55
 "Nerve Centre" – 5:30
 "Side Streets" – 4:12
 "Good to See You" – 6:51
 "Twilight" – 4:57
 "Red Lights" – 3:55
 "Procession" – 9:33

Instruments 
Vangelis plays all instruments: exclusively synthesizers and drum machines. Vocals are by various guest artists, with narrative by Roman Polanski and Emmanuelle Seigner.

Style 
Vangelis employs a wide range of styles, from jazz (2) and rock (3) to new age (5, 6). Instrument patches are all synthesizer-based, but sound very convincing (trumpet on 1, guitar on 3, cello on 8).

Although The City is the first album after Direct (1988), there is no mention of the "Direct series" as discussed in that album's sleeve notes. It can also not be easily linked with his subsequent work, such as the 1492: Conquest of Paradise soundtrack. Vangelis would later compose the soundtrack for Polanski's film Bitter Moon.

References 

1990 albums
Vangelis albums
Concept albums
Atlantic Records albums